Zdravko Dermenov (born 5 September 1998) is a Bulgarian footballer who currently plays as a defender for Rodopa Smolyan.

References

External links

Living people
1998 births
Bulgarian footballers
Association football defenders
Botev Plovdiv players
First Professional Football League (Bulgaria) players